Nithin Thimmaiah Nithin Thimmaiah is an Indian Field Hockey player from Kodagu (Coorg) district, Karnataka. He represented the Indian Hockey team in various international tournaments since his debut in 2012. He currently represents the Comptroller and Auditor General of India (CAG) in domestic hockey.

Education and Early Career 

Hailing from Kodagu, he completed his education from St. Josephs Indian High School, Bangalore and St. Josephs College, Bangalore. He has represented both his alma mater and Bangalore University in numerous tournaments. He has also represented Karnataka State Hockey Team from 2009 and became the captain of the team in 2014 https:

In 2013, he represented Uttar Pradesh Wizards in the Hockey India League and the team went on to win a bronze medal. Subsequently, in 2016, he represented Punjab Warriors in the Hockey India League, who went on to win the championship.

Awards and Recognitions 

In 2015, he was awarded the prestigious Ekalavya Award by the Government of Karnataka for his contributions to hockey. He is also the recipient of Karnataka Olympic Association Award (Best Sportsperson-Hockey) from the Government of Karnataka in 2014.

References

External links
Player profile at Hockey India

1988 births
Living people
People from Kodagu district
Indian male field hockey players
Field hockey players from Karnataka